Each Major League Baseball (MLB) season, one American League (AL) team wins the pennant, signifying that they are the league's champion and have the right to play in the World Series against the champion of the National League (NL). The pennant was presented to the team with the best win–loss record each year through the 1968 season, after which the AL Championship Series (ALCS) was introduced to decide the pennant winner. The first modern World Series was played in 1903 and, after a hiatus in 1904, has taken place every season except 1994, when a players' strike forced the cancellation of the postseason. The current AL pennant holders are the Houston Astros who won the pennant on October 23, 2022.

In 1969, the AL split into two divisions, and the teams with the best records in each division played one another in the five-game ALCS to determine the pennant winner, who received (and continues to receive) the William Harridge Trophy. The trophy featured a golden eagle, the league's emblem, sitting atop a silver baseball and clutching the AL banner. Since 2017, the trophy is all silver with a pennant on top. The trophy is named for Will Harridge, who was league president from 1931 to 1958. The format of the ALCS was changed from a best-of-five to a best-of-seven format in the 1985 postseason. In 1995, an additional playoff series was added when MLB restructured into three divisions in each league. , the winners of the Eastern, Central, and Western Divisions, as well as the AL Wild Card winner, play in the AL Division Series, a best-of-five playoff to determine the opponents who will play in the ALCS. AL pennant winners have gone on to win the World Series 66 times, most recently in 2022.

The New York Yankees have won 40 AL pennants, winning their first in 1921 and their most recent in 2009. This total is more than twice that of the next-closest team, the Oakland Athletics, who have won 15. They are followed by the Boston Red Sox and the Detroit Tigers, with 14 and 11 pennants won respectively. The Yankees have the most pennants since the introduction of the ALCS in 1969 with 11, followed by the Athletics, Red Sox, and the Baltimore Orioles with 6, 6, and 5 respectively. The Yankees also hold the record for most wins by a pennant-winning team, with their 1998 team winning 114 out of 162 games, finishing 22 games ahead of the Boston Red Sox. The 1954 Cleveland Indians won the most games of any pennant winner under the pre-1969 system, winning 111 out of their 154 games and finishing eight games ahead of the Yankees. The Milwaukee Brewers won the AL pennant in 1982 but later moved to the NL starting in the 1998 season.

The only current MLB franchise to have never won a league pennant—and therefore, to have never appeared in the World Series—is the Seattle Mariners.

Key

Pre-expansion (1901–1968)

League Championship Series era (1969–present)

Notes
 A mid-season labor stoppage split the season into two halves. The winner of the first half played the winner of the second half in each division in the 1981 American League Division Series. The winners played in the 1981 ALCS for the American League pennant.
 The leagues were re-aligned in 1994 to three divisions and a wild card was added to the playoffs, but the labor stoppage cancelled the postseason. Wild cards were first used in the 1995 playoffs.
 While Los Angeles Angels of Anaheim was the official name of the team, the team was commonly referred to simply as "Los Angeles Angels", which they changed back to in 2016.

Pennants won by franchise

Notes
 Also known as Baltimore Orioles and New York Highlanders.  In addition to their 40 official pennants, the Yankees had the best won-loss record in the American League when the 1994 season was cut short by a labor dispute.
 Also known as Kansas City Athletics and Philadelphia Athletics
 Also known as Boston Americans
 Also known as St. Louis Browns and Milwaukee Brewers. This does not refer to the New York Yankees, who were known as the Baltimore Orioles in 1901 and 1902.
 Also known as Washington Senators from 1901 to 1960 as called the Nationals from 1905 to 1955.
 Also known as Cleveland Bluebirds (Blues), Cleveland Bronchos, Cleveland Naps, and Cleveland Indians
 Also known as Washington Senators from 1961 to 1971
 Also known as Houston Colt .45's from 1962 to 1964. This does not include one National League pennant. It also does not include 9 postseason appearances as members of the National League.
 Also known as Anaheim Angels, California Angels, and Los Angeles Angels of Anaheim
 Also known as Tampa Bay Devil Rays
 Also known as Seattle Pilots in 1969. The Brewers were members of the American League through the 1997 season after which they switched to the National League. This table records only the Brewers' American League accomplishments.

See also

National League Championship Series
List of National League pennant winners
List of World Series champions

References 
 General
 

 Inline citations

External links
Official League Championship Series Overview from Major League Baseball

American
American League
American League